Love Thy Neighbour is a 1967 Danish-German comedy film directed by Egil Kolstø and starring Walter Giller.

Cast

 Walter Giller as Forfatter Sven Gjeholm
 Ghita Nørby as Britt
 Dirch Passer as Olaf
 Christina Schollin as Solvej
 Carl Ottosen as Peter
 Vivi Bach as Olafs forsvundne kæreste
 Elsa Lystad as Frl. Andresen
 Paul Hagen as Borger i Mårböosen
 Kai Holm as Købmanden
 Axel Strøbye as Hotelejeren
 Ove Sprogøe as Præsten
 Poul Bundgaard as Niels
 Hans W. Petersen as Solvej's far
 Ann Schaufuss as Thea
 Edouard Mielche as Gamle Elias
 William Kisum as Skolelæreren
 Hanne Løye as Skolelærerens kone
 Tove Maës as Borger i Mårböosen
 Basse Nicolaisen as Hotelkarl
 Mogens Brandt as Tjeneren
 Karl Stegger as Postmesteren

External links

1967 films
1967 comedy films
Danish comedy films
German comedy films
West German films
1960s Danish-language films
1960s German films